Makosso is a Congolese surname that may refer to:

Anatole Collinet Makosso (born 1965), Republic of the Congo politician
Francois Luc Makosso (1938–2020), Congolese politician
René Makosso (born 1979), Congolese swimmer

Surnames of Congolese origin
Kongo-language surnames